Stade Sheikh Mohamed Laghdaf (Arabic: ملعب الشيخ محمد لغضف) is a multi-use stadium located in Laayoune, Western Sahara. It is used mostly for football matches. The stadium has a maximum capacity of 15,000 people and is home the JS Massira football club of Laayoune.

References

External links 
 
 Soccerway

Football venues in Western Sahara
Buildings and structures in Laayoune
1984 establishments in Western Sahara